This is a list of Vanderbilt Commodores football players in the NFL Draft.

Key

Selections

See also
List of Vanderbilt University people

References

External links
 

Vanderbilt

Vanderbilt Commodores NFL Draft